The Marshall Archipelago is an extensive group of large ice-covered islands within the Sulzberger Ice Shelf off Antarctica. Several of the islands were discovered and plotted by the Byrd Antarctic Expeditions (1928–30 and 1933–35) and by the United States Antarctic Service (1939–41), all led by Admiral Richard E. Byrd. The full extent of the archipelago was mapped by the United States Geological Survey from surveys and U.S. Navy air photos (1959–65). The name was proposed by Admiral Byrd for General of the Army George C. Marshall, who made financial contributions as a private individual and also, on the same basis, provided advisory assistance to the Byrd expedition of 1933–35.

Islands

Cronenwett Island is an island  in length making it the longest island in the archipelago. The island lies between Vollmer Island and Steventon Island in the Marshall Archipelago. Although the island is near Vollmer Island, Vollmer Island is not actually considered one of the islands of the Marshall Archipelago.

Hannah Island is an island lying between Hutchinson Island and Guest Peninsula lying within the Marshall Archipelago.

Kramer Island is an island  in length and is situated between Nolan Island and Court Ridge in the Marshall Archipelago.

Madden Island is an island  in length and is located between Moody Island and Grinder Island in the Marshall Archipelago.

Barela Rock appears to be a rock formation of interest, located in the southern portion of Przybyszewski Island.

References

Islands of Marie Byrd Land